WITF-TV (channel 33) is a non-commercial television station in Harrisburg, Pennsylvania, United States, a member station of PBS serving the Susquehanna Valley region (Harrisburg–Lancaster–Lebanon–York). It is owned by WITF, Inc., alongside the area's NPR member, WITF-FM (89.5). Both stations share studios at the WITF Public Media Center in Swatara Township (with a Harrisburg mailing address), while WITF-TV's transmitter is located in Middle Paxton Township, next to the transmitter of CBS affiliate WHP-TV (channel 21). WITF's programming is relayed on low-power digital translator station W20EU-D (channel 20) in Chambersburg.

WITF-TV was established as the first public media outlet in the region in 1964 and was based in Hershey for its first 18 years of existence. It expanded into radio with WITF-FM in 1971 and moved to Harrisburg in 1982. The station's local initiatives include programs on topics of local interest as well as several collaborative ventures in statewide news and educational content.

History 

In 1963, the Pennsylvania Educational Network proposed the introduction of a series of new noncommercial television allotments in the state: channel 3 at Clearfield, channel 36 at Altoona, channel 39 at Allentown (then a commercial channel), channel 65 at Harrisburg, and channel 68 at Scranton. The South Central Educational Broadcasting Council was formed to apply for, build and manage the Harrisburg station. Even before a construction permit application was filed, negotiations began to use the Dauphin County site already home to WHP-TV.

South Central Educational filed its construction permit application in December 1963, specifying a location at Hershey, where studios would be maintained on land donated by the Hershey Estates. The nine counties in the planned service area of the new station were tasked with contributing funds for its startup, while the Department of Health, Education, and Welfare contributed $200,000 in the form of a grant. After the grant, the FCC granted a construction permit on June 30.

The Hudson Broadcasting Corporation, owner of Harrisburg radio station WCMB, held some equipment and a construction permit, unbuilt and unused, for channel 33 in Harrisburg. After reaching a purchase agreement with that firm, South Central Educational filed to move its proposed WITF-TV down from channel 65 to 33. While this would prolong the time needed to put the new station to air by two months, it would reduce costs and improve coverage. Technical difficulties pushed the start back a week, but at a third of authorized power, channel 33 began broadcasting on November 22, 1964. The call letters had been chosen by portraitist Florence Starr Taylor to represent the phrase "it's top flight".

Chambersburg was predicted to receive poor coverage from the Harrisburg transmitter, and a translator for Franklin County went into service in 1965, the predecessor to today's W20EU-D. The station was quickly embraced by the community; April 1971 brought the launch of WITF-FM 89.5, and by 1979, it had the third-highest percentage of supporting members of any public television station in the United States, with viewers contributing 32 percent of its budget. The original transmission equipment was replaced in 1977 along with the commissioning of a new, taller tower, improving coverage and reducing the increasing number of faults attributable to its aging plant.

After leasing space at the Hershey Community Center for 15 years, the Milton Hershey School Trust sold the building in 1979 to Hershey Foods. As a result, WITF radio and television were forced to contemplate a move, examining sites in Derry and South Hanover townships; the stations looked at a new build site which would cost about the same as renovations it had previously planned. In late 1979, the governing board for the stations entered into an agreement under which WITF would have owned and operated a new,  facility at Harrisburg Area Community College. Robert F. Larson, the president and general manager, noted that the proximity to the Commonwealth capital and educational institutions made a site in Harrisburg desirable. However, the board discovered it would not actually own the land, which was a deal-breaker for WITF and led to the college proposal being dropped. Instead, the council mulled other sites and a proposal to create mini-studios throughout its service area. A nine-acre site was considered and then shelved in early 1981 due to concerns about federal funding cutbacks from the new Reagan administration. Headquarters were initially moved to a Hershey building shared with the public library, but the station ultimately secured facilities on Locust Road in northeast Harrisburg, in the form of the closing Anna L. Carter Elementary School in Susquehanna Township; the closure of the school attracted some opposition to the move from residents. The stations moved in November 1982, with the community of license changing from Hershey to Harrisburg.

Spurred by growth and technological changes, and with 50 more employees than it had in 1982, WITF launched a capital campaign in 2002 to build a new, $22.2 million public media center on a site in Swatara Township, adjacent to Interstate 283. Not only was the Locust Road site hard to find, it lacked an elevator and was not compliant with the Americans with Disabilities Act. Ground was broken in 2005, and staff moved into the new facility in 2006.

Local programming and initiatives 
WITF produces several local programs for the south-central Pennsylvania area, including a series on health (Transforming Health) and the annual Central PA Spelling Bee. Drawings for the Pennsylvania Lottery, aired statewide by a network of commercial stations, are also produced at WITF. WITF also produced some television programs that are aired nationally on PBS, such as Computer Chronicles (co-produced with KCSM-TV from 1983 to 1995).

In 2018, WITF launched PA Post, a statewide news outlet; the creation of such was suggested as a potential use for funds received in the FCC spectrum auction of 2017. PA Post was folded into Spotlight PA, an investigative portal run by several major Pennsylvania newspapers, in 2020.

Joining two other PBS stations, WITF helped launch the Public Media Educational Platform (which soon changed its name to the Information Equity Initiative) in 2021, with the goal of using datacasting to transmit educational programming to school students without sufficient broadband access. As part of the initiative, WITF has conducted pilots serving K-12 students and prison inmates.

Technical information

Subchannels 

The station's digital channel is multiplexed:

Translator

In August 1998, WITF-TV became the first television station in Pennsylvania to operate a digital signal.

WITF-TV discontinued regular programming on its analog signal over UHF channel 33 on February 17, 2009, to conclude the federally mandated transition from analog to digital television; the station's digital signal remained on UHF channel 36, using virtual channel 33.

WITF agreed to share its spectrum with Tribune Broadcasting-owned Fox affiliate WPMT (channel 43) following the 2016–2017 FCC incentive auction for $25 million on February 10, 2017. The proceeds were slated to be transferred to WITF's endowment, with interest to be used for Central Pennsylvania's media literacy program; a statewide news organization was cited as another possibility, foreshadowing the creation of PA Post.

References

External links 
 

PBS member stations
ITF-TV
Television channels and stations established in 1964
1964 establishments in Pennsylvania